Utricularia benthamii is a terrestrial carnivorous plant that belongs to the genus Utricularia (family Lentibulariaceae). It is endemic to Western Australia and is found southwest of Lake Muir, Manjimup, and Bridgetown.

See also 
 List of Utricularia species

References 

Carnivorous plants of Australia
Eudicots of Western Australia
benthamii
Lamiales of Australia